o-sec-Butylphenol is an industrial chemical used in dyeing and as a chemical intermediate. It is synthesized from phenol and 1-butene in an ortho-alkylation reaction. It is corrosive to the eyes, skin, and gastrointestinal tract.

References

Phenols